John MacDougall Parker (born September 19, 1967) is an American rower.

Parker was born in New York City in 1967. He started rowing in 1981.

He competed at the 1992 Summer Olympics in Barcelona with the men's eight where they came fourth. Parker was a member of the US national rowing team from 1989 to 1993. After his active rowing career he became a rowing coach. In 2007, he became the US national lightweight rowing coach for both men and women.

Parker is married to the Czech rower Hana Dariusová who also competed at the 1992 Summer Olympics.

References

1967 births
Living people 
American male rowers
Olympic rowers of the United States
Rowers at the 1992 Summer Olympics
Sportspeople from New York City